Sir Clifford Straughn Husbands GCMG KStJ KA QC (5 August 1926 – 11 October 2017) was a Barbadian judge who served as the sixth Governor-General of Barbados. He held this office from 1996, when he was appointed after the death of Nita Barrow, until he retired on 31 October 2011.

Husbands died suddenly of a heart attack on 11 October 2017 at the age of 91. He was predeceased by his wife, Lady Ruby Husbands (née Parris), who died on 7 July 2009.

See also

Governor-General of Barbados

References

External links
 Photo
 Biography

 

1926 births
2017 deaths
Barbadian knights
Barbadian judges
Barbadian lawyers
Governors-General of Barbados
Knights and Dames of St Andrew (Barbados)
Members of the Middle Temple
People educated at Harrison College (Barbados)
Barbadian Queen's Counsel
20th-century Barbadian lawyers